Turkovac (temporarily named as ERUCOV-VAC) is a COVID-19 vaccine developed by Turkish Ministry of Health and Erciyes University.


Clinical trials 
In November 2020, TURKOVAC started on phase I trials with 44 participants in Turkey.

In February 2021, TURKOVAC started on phase II trials with 250 participants in Turkey.

In June 2021, TURKOVAC started on phase III trials with 40,800 participants in Turkey.

Authorization 
On 25 November 2021, the Turkish Minister of Health reported that Turkovac's application for emergency use authorization had been filed. On 22 December, Turkish President Recep Tayyip  Erdogan announced the emergency use approval of Turkovac.

References 

Clinical trials
Turkish COVID-19 vaccines
Drugs not assigned an ATC code
Products introduced in 2020
Inactivated vaccines